Jóna Nicolajsen (born 16 May 1986) is a Faroese football goalkeeper. She plays for B36 Tórshavn and the Faroe Islands women's national football team.

References 

1986 births
Living people
Faroese women's footballers
Faroe Islands women's international footballers
Women's association football goalkeepers